Holme Hale is a village situated in the Breckland District of Norfolk and covers an area of 1069 hectares (4.13 square miles) with an estimated population of 444 as of UK census 2001.
 
Holme Hale is served by St Andrews church in the Benefice of Necton.

It once had a railway station on the line between Swaffham and Thetford. The station and goods sheds are now private dwellings and form part of the satellite hamlet of Holme Hale Station Road.

Holme Hale Hall opens its gardens for the charitable NGS.

Holme Hale hosts an ADSL broadband enabled telephone exchange serving approx. 1,464 residential premises and 59 non-residential premises.

References

Villages in Norfolk
Civil parishes in Norfolk
Breckland District